Vall de Núria is a ski resort located in the Núria valley, in Catalonia. The ski area extends from 1,964 to 2,252 metres.

The resort has a total of ten alpine ski trails (three green, three blue, two red and two black) and a special track for sleds. In total, seven km of marked trails. In the summer of 2006 there were 18 new snow cannons installed. A total of 73 snow cannons supplement natural snow cover.

About lifts, the resort has a four-seater chairlift fixed-grip (going from the lowest elevation, 1,964 m, to the highest, 2,252),a cable in the Coma del Clot that allows access to the hostel of the Pic de l'Àliga and two lifts that serve the beginners' area.

External links
 Official website

Ski areas and resorts in Catalonia